Al-Narjis is a Syrian farm located in the Subdistrict of the Hama District in the Hama Governorate.  According to the Syria Central Bureau of Statistics (CBS), al-Narjis had a population of 8 in the 2004 census.

References 

Populated places in Hama District